†Spironema is a genus of extinct (Cretaceous) sea snails, marine gastropod mollusks in the family Naticidae, the moon snails.

Description 
The American paleontologist Fielding Bradford Meek firstly defined this genus in 1864. He classified the genus in the family Littorinidae. He recognized two species Spironema bella and Spironema tenuilineata in 1864. These species were previously classified within the family Trochidae. Meek's diagnosis reads as follows:

Species
Species within the genus Spironema include:

 Spironema bella (Conrad) - synonym: Tuba (?) bella Conrad, from Cretaceous of Alabama
 Spironema tenuilineata (Meek & Hayden, 1856) - from Cretaceous of Dakota Territory, type species: Turbo tenuilineatus Meek & Hayden, 1856 - synonym: Turbo tenuilineata
 Spironema perryi Stephenson - from Maastrichtian, Texas. Spironema cf. perryi is also known from the Upper Cretaceous, Cliff House Sandstone, Chaco Canyon, northwestern New Mexico.

References
This article incorporates public domain text from the reference

Further reading 
 Meek F. B. (1876). "A report on the Invertebrate Cretaceous and Tertiary Fossils of the Upper Missouri Country". Report of the United States Geological Survey of the territories, Washington, volume ix: i-ixv, 1-629, plates i-xlv. Spironema is on pages 341-343. Plate 32, figure 9a-c.
 Stephenson L. W. (1941). The larger invertebrate fossils of the Navarro group of Texas. The University of Texas Publication 4101: 1-625.

Naticidae
Cretaceous gastropods
Fossil taxa described in 1876